Tierbach may refer to:

Tierbach (Ette), a river of Baden-Württemberg, Germany, headstream of the Ette
Tierbach (Murr), a river of Baden-Württemberg, Germany, tributary of the Murr